Garwood is an unincorporated community in Wyoming County, West Virginia, United States.

References 

Unincorporated communities in Wyoming County, West Virginia
Coal towns in West Virginia